Central Rook vs Side Pawn is an older joseki for a Central Rook position by White played against a Static Rook position played by Black that captures White's side pawn on 34. (Cf. the Double Static Rook Side Pawn Capture opening.) 

It was seen up until the 1950s-1980s but is now no longer used by professional players as the judgment of the position then appeared to strongly favor Black.

An example of this opening occurred in the meijin match between Masao Tsukada (塚田正夫) and Yoshio Kimura (木村義雄) on June 6, 1947.

Development

1. P-76 P-34, 2. P-26 P-54, 3. P-25. The opening starts with a position that with both players' bishop diagonals open looks similar to White's Cheerful Central Rook (which hadn't been invented yet). Both bishop diagonals are open, Black has chosen a Static Rook position, and White has pushed their central pawn.

3...P-55. However, on the fifth move, joseki diverges from Cheerful Central Rook. White's central pawn is pushed to the middle rank 5 closing the bishop diagonal and preventing a bishop trade.

(The Cheerful Central Rook joseki instead swings their rook to the central file (R-52).

4. P-24 Px24, Rx24. Since the bishop diagonal is closed, Black can trade pawns on the second file.

Subsequently, Black captures White's side pawn while White swings their rook to the central file. 

After moving their rook back to the second file, White attacks on the central file and then trades bishops.

See also

 Central Rook
 Side Pawn Capture
 Static Rook

References

Bibliography

 
 

Shogi openings
Static Rook vs Ranging Rook openings
Central Rook openings